Amanda Conway is an American ice hockey forward, currently playing with the Connecticut Whale in the Premier Hockey Federation (PHF).

Career 
Across 111 games with Norwich University, she would score 188 points, the leading NCAA Division III scorer in her final year and third all-time in Division III scorers. In 2017, she had been named New England Hockey Conference Rookie of the Year, would be named NEHC Conference Player of the Year a record three times, and would lead the university to a national title in 2018.

She was drafted 19th overall by the Connecticut Whale in the 2020 NWHL Draft, and would sign her first professional contract with the team ahead of the 2020–21 season.

Personal life 
Conway has a degree in psychology. She attended Methuen High School.

External links

References 

1997 births
Living people
Connecticut Whale (PHF) players
People from Methuen, Massachusetts
Norwich Cadets athletes